The 2015–16 winter transfer window for English football transfers opened on 1 January and closes on 1 February. Additionally, players without a club may join at any time, clubs may sign players on loan at any time, and clubs may sign a goalkeeper on an emergency loan if they have no registered goalkeeper available. This list includes transfers featuring at least one Premier League or Football League Championship club which were completed after the end of the summer 2015 transfer window and before the end of the 2015–16 winter window. The transfer window is open for all clubs, whereas when the transfer window closes, no transfers can take place. 1 February 2016 is the transfer deadline day.

Transfers

All clubs without a flag are English. Note that while Cardiff City, Swansea City and Newport County are affiliated with the Football Association of Wales and thus take the Welsh flag, they play in the English football league system, and so their transfers are included here.

 Player officially joined his club on 2 January 2016.
 Transfer will be completed in January 2016.

References

Specific

Transfers Winter 2015-16
Winter 2015-16
English